Razdarestan (also Romanized as Razdārestān; also known as Razrestān) is a village in Khoshabar Rural District, Central District of  Rezvanshahr County, Gilan Province, Iran. At the 2006 census, its population was 34, in 9 families.

References 

Populated places in Rezvanshahr County